Nina Humphreys is a British composer of music for film and television.

Humphries was educated at Brighton College from 1989 to 1991 and has a bachelor's degree in Music from the University of Exeter and an MA in Film Music from Bournemouth University.

Works
Humphreys has composed music for:

References

External links
Official website
British Comedy Guide: Nina Humphreys

Year of birth missing (living people)
Living people
20th-century British composers
20th-century women composers
21st-century British composers
21st-century women composers
Alumni of Bournemouth University
Alumni of the University of Exeter
British women composers
British film score composers
British television composers
Women film score composers
Women television composers
People educated at Brighton College